Deborah Watkins Bruner is an American researcher, clinical trialist, and academic.  She is the senior vice president for research at Emory University.  Her research focus is on patient reported outcomes, symptom management across cancer sites, sexuality after cancer treatment, and effectiveness of radiotherapy modalities. Bruner's research has been continually funding since 1998, with total funding of her research exceeding $180 million. She is ranked among the top five percent of all National Institutes of Health-funded investigators worldwide since 2012, according to the Blue Ridge Institute for Medical Research.

Biography 
Bruner is professor and Robert W. Woodruff Chair in Nursing at the Nell Hodgson Woodruff School of Nursing, professor of radiation oncology at the Emory University School of Medicine, and a member of the Winship Cancer Institute.

She earned a degree in nursing from West Chester University and M.S. degrees in nursing administration and nursing oncology from Widener University.  In 1999, she earned a Ph.D. in outcomes research from the University of Pennsylvania, supervised by Rosalyn J. Watts.  She held roles at the Fox Chase Cancer Center prior to joining the faculty at the University of Pennsylvania as professor of nursing in 2009.

Bruner joined the Winship Cancer Institute of Emory University in 2011 as associate director for outcomes research and professor of nursing and radiation oncology.  She then served as assistant dean for faculty mentoring and advancement in the Woodruff School of Nursing.

Leadership 
In 2015, she was appointed by President Barack Obama to the National Cancer Advisory Board where she is the only nurse to serve on the board. She was elected to the National Academy of Medicine in 2016 where she serves on committees related to radioactive sources and cancer.

In October 2018, Bruner was named Senior Vice President for Research, Emory University, where she focused on interdisciplinary research.  In announcing her appointment, University President Claire Sterk said ““With Bruner’s leadership and expertise, Emory will be even better positioned to address 21st century challenges through increased discovery and intellectual imagination and innovation.”

Her global work includes leading a 2018 partnership project to assist in opening the first modern radiotherapy in Ethiopia through 3D treatment planning and quality assurance.  As the co-chair of National Cancer Institute’s Global Health Working Group, her role is to review the NCI global portfolio and provide recommendations for the allocation of NCI’s resources.

In 2020, Bruner was instrumental in bringing Science Gallery, the world’s only university network dedicated to public engagement with science and art, to Atlanta, Georgia. Emory University became the second U.S.-based Science Gallery location.

Research 
Bruner is the first and only nurse to ever lead as principal investigator for the National Cancer Institute National Clinical Trials Network Cancer Control Programs. She was Principal Investigator (PI) of the Radiation Therapy Oncology group (RTOG-Community Clinical Oncology Program) and currently serves as multi-PI of the NRG Oncology-National Clinical Oncology Research Program. She has led or been a member of numerous NCI committees related to clinical trials. Her research focuses on patient-reported outcomes (PROs), symptom management clinical trials across cancer sites and patient recruitment to clinical trials. Her current research is focused on the microbiome and cancer.

Publications 
Bruner has published more than 240 peer-reviewed journal articles, and 16 books/book chapters. She has served as editor-in-chief of one book and three editions of an ONS Guidelines Manual for radiation oncology nursing. Her collaborative research has been published in scientific and academic publications including the International Journal of Radiation Oncology, The Journal of the National Cancer Institute, Neuro Oncology, and the New England Journal of Medicine.

Highly cited articles 
 2018, "The gut microbiome, symptoms, and targeted interventions in children with cancer: a systematic review." In Supportive Care in Cancer 26.2: 427-439.
 2014 "Recommended patient-reported core set of symptoms to measure in adult cancer treatment trials." In JNCI: Journal of the National Cancer Institute 106.7.
 2013, "Memantine for the prevention of cognitive dysfunction in patients receiving whole-brain radiotherapy: a randomized, double-blind, placebo-controlled trial." In Neuro-oncology 15.10: 1429-1437.
 2013 "Preliminary toxicity analysis of 3-dimensional conformal radiation therapy versus intensity modulated radiation therapy on the high-dose arm of the Radiation Therapy Oncology Group 0126 prostate cancer trial." In the International Journal of Radiation Oncology, Biology, Physics 87.5: 932-938.
 2011, "Palliative radiotherapy for bone metastases: an ASTRO evidence-based guideline." In International Journal of Radiation Oncology, Biology, Physics 79.4: 965-976.
 2011,"Radiotherapy and short-term androgen deprivation for localized prostate cancer." New England Journal of Medicine 365.2: 107-118.
 2005, "Randomized trial of short-versus long-course radiotherapy for palliation of painful bone metastases.” In Journal of the National Cancer Institute 97.11: 798-804.
 2003, "Relative risk of prostate cancer for men with affected relatives: systematic review and meta‐analysis." In International Journal of Cancer 107.5: 797-803.
 1993 "Vaginal stenosis and sexual function following intracavitary radiation for the treatment of cervical and endometrial carcinoma." In International Journal of Radiation Oncology, Biology, Physics 27.4: 825-830.

Awards and memberships 

 2018 Rose Mary Carroll-Johnson Distinguished Award for Consistent Contribution to Nursing Literature, Oncology Nursing Society
 2018 Appointed National Cancer Institute Global Health Working Group Co-Chair
 2016 Elected to National Academy of Medicine
 2016 Induction, International Nurse Researcher Hall of Fame, Sigma Theta Tau
 2015-2020 U.S. Presidential appointment to the National Cancer Advisory Board, NCI
 2015 Distinguished Researcher Award, Oncology Nursing Society
 2011 Named Robert W. Woodruff Chair in Nursing, Emory University
 2004 Excellence in Radiation Oncology, Oncology Nursing Society/Varian Nursing Award

References

Year of birth missing (living people)
Living people
Emory University School of Medicine faculty